"Just Like You" is a single by Canadian rock band Three Days Grace. It was the second single from their eponymous debut album. In 2004, the song became their first number-one hit on the U.S. Billboard Modern Rock Tracks and Hot Mainstream Rock Tracks charts. Despite peaking at number one on both charts, it still did not capture the popularity and pop radio success of their prior single, "I Hate Everything About You", which had peaked at numbers two and number four, respectively, but overall having more airplay on mainstream rock, active rock, and modern rock radio stations than "Just Like You". However, both songs peaked at the same position (number 55) on the Billboard Hot 100 chart. The song earned a nomination at the 2005 Radio Music Awards for "Song of the Year: Rock Radio".

Background and meaning
Adam Gontier reflected on the meaning behind the song; he said:
"It's about being told how to live your life. When we were growing up, we saw it sort of first hand. A lot of our friends were pushed into doing jobs their parents were telling them to do. It's about being pushed around and told how to live your life and standing up for yourself."

In May 2006, the single won a BDS Spin Award based on the 200,000 spins it received. A mash up to the song called, "Just Like Wylin'" was released in 2005 with American rapper Bone Crusher. The song was featured in the XXX: State of the Union soundtrack.

Music video
The music video for "Just Like You" features the band playing behind a two-way mirror. The opposite side of the mirror shows dozens of motionless people standing in straight lines while security guards and distinguished superiors look over them. The band appears to be wearing identical jumpsuits and conforming along with the rest of the individuals on their side of the mirror, while the band is actually performing wildly behind the mirror. One of the men in line notices a glitch in the mirror and begins to bob his head. He stops after the chief guard is given approval by one of the distinguished superiors to keep order. As the song comes closer to the end, the glass shatters against the guards and the men and women throw off their masks. The scene quickly begins to mimic that of a rave, the scene now resembling that of a typical rock concert. The video ends just as it began, with everyone in the room lined up wearing jumpsuits and masks, as if nothing had ever happened, possibly signifying the futility of rebellious endeavors. It is the first music video to feature Barry Stock performing with the band. The video was directed by Scott Winig.

Track listing

Charts

Weekly charts

Year-end charts

Certifications

Release history

References

External links

 

2003 songs
2004 singles
Three Days Grace songs
Songs written by Adam Gontier
Songs written by Gavin Brown (musician)
Song recordings produced by Gavin Brown (musician)
Jive Records singles
Canadian alternative rock songs